Lim Jong-heon (Korean: 임종헌; born March 8, 1968) is a South Korean former footballer who played as a defender and currently the head coach of Lijiang Jiayunhao.

He started professional career at Ilhwa Chunma in 1989 and he transferred to Ulsan Hyundai in 1994.

He managed Pattya United and Pattaya promoted to Thai Premier League in 2016

References

External links 
 

1968 births
Living people
Association football defenders
Seongnam FC players
Ulsan Hyundai FC players
K League 1 players
South Korean footballers
Korea University alumni
Expatriate football managers in China
South Korean football managers